David Pollock may refer to:

David Pollock (judge) (1780–1847), British judge in India
David Pollock (actor) (born 1961), former American child actor
David Pollock (rugby union) (born 1987), rugby union player for Ulster Rugby
David Pollock, 3rd Viscount Hanworth (born 1946), British peer, academic and Labour member of the House of Lords
David Pollock (humanist) (born 1942), British secular humanist
Dave Pollock (born 1942), former Australian politician
David C. Pollock (1939–2004), sociologist

See also
David Pollack (born 1984), American football player
David Pollack (politician)